Jersey competed at the 1962 British Empire and Commonwealth Games in Perth, Western Australia, from 22 November to 1 December 1962. In their second appearance at the Games, Jersey had 13 competitors compete in four sports.

Medalists

References

1962
Nations at the 1962 British Empire and Commonwealth Games
British Empire and Commonwealth Games